Tim Smyczek was the defending champion, but lost to Cedrik-Marcel Stebe in the semifinals.
Denis Kudla defeated Stebe 6–3, 6–3 in the final to win the title.

Seeds

Draw

Finals

Top half

Bottom half

References
 Main Draw
 Qualifying Draw

2013 Singles